Drunmore Linn is a waterfall of Scotland, near Straiton, South Ayrshire.

See also
Waterfalls of Scotland

References

Waterfalls of Scotland